Psalmen Davids (Psalms of David) is a collection of sacred choral music, settings mostly of psalms in German by Heinrich Schütz, who had studied the Venetian polychoral style with Giovanni Gabrieli. Book 1 was printed in Dresden in 1619 as his Opus 2. It comprises 26 individual settings, which were assigned numbers 22 to 47 in the Schütz-Werke-Verzeichnis (SWV). Most of them use the text of a complete psalm in the translation by Martin Luther.

The full title of the publication, "Psalmen Davids / sampt / Etlichen Moteten und Concerten / mit acht und mehr Stimmen / Nebenst andern zweyen Capellen daß dero etliche / auff drey und vier Chor nach beliebung gebraucht / werden können", indicates that some motets and concertos are added to the psalm settings, and the scoring is for eight and more voices and two groups of instrumentalists, so that in some pieces three and even four choirs can participate in polychoral settings.

History 

In 1619, Schütz took up his office as Hofkapellmeister at the court of the Elector of Saxony, Johann Georg I., in Dresden, succeeding Rogier Michael. On 1 June, he married Magdalena, the daughter of Christian Wildeck, a court official. Planned well, the Psalmen Davids appeared the same day, dedicated to the Elector.

Schütz mentions in the introduction: "daß er etzliche Teutsche Psalmen auf Italienische Manier komponiert habe, zu welcher [er] von [seinem] lieben und in aller Welt hochberühmten Praeceptore Herrn Johan Gabrieln / ... / mit fleiß angeführet worden ... war" (that he composed several German psalms in Italian manner, to which he was induced intensely by his dear preceptor Giovanni Gabrieli, highly famous in all the world).

Collection 

Schütz chose 20 psalms, two of which he set twice, and added movements based on a hymn, the first stanza of Johann Gramann's "Nun lob, mein Seel, den Herren", and on texts from the prophets Isaiah and Jeremiah. Most, but not all psalms are ended by the doxology (in the table short: dox), "Ehre sei dem Vater" (Glory be to the Father). Translations of SWV 24, 25, 27, 28, 30, 33, 36, 37, 39 and 40 are provided by Emmanuel Music

Reception 
A reviewer from Gramophone wrote that Psalmen Davids "ranks among [Schütz's] most sumptuous and spectacular achievements". Fabrice Fitch referred to it as the composer's "first monumental publication of sacred music", agreeing with Peter Wollny's comment on "its variety in the treatment of a medium whose potential for cliche is, after all, very great".

Publication and recordings 

The Psalmen Davids are part of the complete edition of the composer's works by Carus-Verlag, begun in 1992 as the Stuttgart Schütz Edition and planned to be completed by 2017. They were recorded, as part of the complete recordings of works by Schütz, by the Dresdner Kammerchor and organist Ludger Rémy, conducted by Hans-Christoph Rademann. Soloists are sopranos Dorothee Mields and Marie Luise Werneburg, altos David Erler and Stefan Kunath, tenors Georg Poplutz and Tobias Mäthger, and basses Stephan MacLeod and Felix Schwandtke. A review notes the accent on a contrast, as the composer intended, between the soloists (favoriti) and the choir (ripieno): These soloists, the so-called 'favoriti' are given the responsibility of bringing illustrative power to their sung lines, to sing 'as well and as sweetly' as possible. These solo singers are vested with the conveyance of the texts’ imagery in all its power and immediacy, whilst the ripieno choruses have a different function, which is, in the composer's words, 'for a strong sound and for splendour'.

References

External links 

Heinrich Schütz: / Psalms of David / Psalmen Davids Deutsche Grammophon 1997
Heinrich Schütz | Psalmen Davids Cantus Cölln 1998 
Heinrich Schütz: "Psalmen Davids" / Hans-Christoph Rademanns kongeniale Einspielung ist eine Huldigung an den "Vater der deutschen Musik" Kulturradio, 14 November 2013 

Compositions by Heinrich Schütz
Choral compositions
Psalm settings
1619 works